Acanthocinus obsoletus is a species of longhorn beetles of the subfamily Lamiinae. It was described by Guillaume-Antoine Olivier in 1795. It can be found in eastern North America, Cuba, and the Bahamas.

References

Beetles described in 1795
Acanthocinus